Pilodeudorix aurivilliusi, the Aurivillius' diopetes, is a butterfly in the family Lycaenidae. It is found in Guinea-Bissau, Sierra Leone, Ivory Coast, Liberia, Ghana and Togo. The habitat consists of forests.

Adults have been recorded feeding from the flowers of Cleistopholis patens.

References

Butterflies described in 1954
Deudorigini